Mia Höhne (born 29 September 2000) is a German curler from Füssen. She is currently the second on the German National Women's Curling Team skipped by Daniela Jentsch.

Career
Höhne skipped the German national junior women's curling team from 2016 to 2020. She never qualified for the World Junior Curling Championships through the World Junior B Curling Championships. She joined the women's rink of Daniela Jentsch as their alternate in 2019 and they went 5–7 at the 2019 World Women's Curling Championship.

Höhne was promoted to third on Team Jentsch when they represented Germany at the 2021 World Women's Curling Championship, which was played in a bio-secure bubble in Calgary, Canada due the ongoing pandemic. The team had to play with just three players as second Klara-Hermine Fomm and alternate Emira Abbes tested positive for COVID-19 upon their arrival, and had to be quarantined. At the Worlds, the threesome of Daniela Jentsch, Höhne and Analena Jentsch finished in ninth place with a 6–7 record.

Höhne joined Team Jentsch fulltime for the 2021–22 season. The team began at the 2021 Euro Super Series where they reached the semifinal round before losing to Rebecca Morrison. They also reached the semifinals of the 2021 Sherwood Park Women's Curling Classic where they were eliminated by Kerri Einarson. In October, the team won the Alberta Curling Series: Thistle tour event, defeating Kayla Skrlik in the final. At the 2021 European Curling Championships, Team Jentsch finished the round robin with a 6–3 record, qualifying for the playoffs again as the fourth seed. They then lost to Scotland's Eve Muirhead in the semifinal, however, were able to rebound to secure the bronze medal, once again defeating Russia's Alina Kovaleva rink in the bronze medal game. The team's next event was the 2021 Olympic Qualification Event, where they attempted to qualify for the 2022 Winter Olympics. After a slow start, they could not rebound in time to reach the qualification round, finishing in sixth place with a 3–5 record. In January, they competed in back-to-back tour events in Switzerland, reaching the semifinals of the St. Galler Elite Challenge and the final of the International Bernese Ladies Cup where they lost to Raphaela Keiser. Next for the team was the 2022 World Women's Curling Championship where they finished in ninth place with a 5–7 record. Because of their successful tour season, Team Jentsch had enough points to qualify for the year-end 2022 Players' Championship, their first top tier Grand Slam event. There, they finished with 2–3 record, just missing the playoff round.

Personal life
As of 2020, she is employed as a sports soldier.

Teams

References

External links
 
 
 

Living people
2000 births
German female curlers

Sportspeople from Ludwigshafen
Sportspeople from Füssen